Velveeta is a brand name for a processed cheese product similar to American cheese. It was invented in 1918 by Emil Frey of the "Monroe Cheese Company" in Monroe, New York. In 1923, "The Velveeta Cheese Company" was incorporated as a separate company. In 1925, it advertised two varieties, Swiss and American. The firm was purchased by Kraft Foods Inc. in 1927.

Overview 
In the 1930s, Velveeta became the first cheese product to gain the American Medical Association's seal of approval. It was reformulated in 1953 as a "cheese spread", but as of 2002 Velveeta must be labeled in the United States as a "pasteurized prepared cheese product."

The name Velveeta was intended to connote a "velvety smooth" edible product. Smoothness and melting ability are promoted as properties that result from reincorporating the whey with the curd. The brand has been expanded into a line of products including cheesy bites, macaroni and cheese, and cheesy skillets.

Ingredients

Kraft Foods lists Velveeta's ingredients as: milk, water, whey, milk protein concentrate, milkfat, whey protein concentrate, sodium phosphate, and 2% or less of salt, calcium phosphate, lactic acid, sorbic acid, sodium citrate, sodium alginate, enzymes, apocarotenal, annatto, and cheese culture.

Classification as a cheese product 
In 2002, the FDA issued a warning letter to Kraft that Velveeta was being sold with packaging that described it as a "pasteurized process cheese spread", which the FDA claimed was false because the product listed milk protein concentrate (MPC) in its ingredients. Velveeta is now sold in the US as a "pasteurized prepared cheese product", a term for which the FDA does not maintain a standard of identity, and which therefore may contain milk protein concentrate.

Marketing and advertising 

Kraft Foods has marketed Velveeta as an ingredient in chile con queso and grilled cheese sandwiches. It is currently sold in the United States, Canada, Panama, Hong Kong, the Philippines, and South Korea. In the 1930s and 1940s, it was sold in the United Kingdom and Germany as "Velveta". 

In the 1980s, Velveeta used the advertising jingle, "Colby, Swiss and Cheddar, blended all together" in its US television commercials to explain its taste and texture because real cheese was used in the product at that time.

See also 
 Velveeta Shells & Cheese
 Convenience food
 Processed cheese

References

External links
 
 Smithsonian.com: There is No Shortage of History When it Comes to Velveeta

Products introduced in 1918
American cheeses
Kraft Foods brands
Processed cheese
Monroe, New York